Bank of Africa is a large commercial bank in Morocco, known until 2020 as Banque Marocaine du Commerce Extérieur (BMCE, ("Moroccan Bank of Foreign Commerce"). According to the company's website, it operates over 697 branches in Morocco. It is part of the Casablanca-headquartered Bank of Africa Group.

External links

Banque Marocaine du Commerce Extérieur Exterieur
 Currency Exchange Practices at Moroccan Banks

Banks of Morocco
Companies based in Casablanca
Crédit Mutuel